The Battle of Algeciras or Siege of Algeciras may refer to:

 Siege of Algeciras (1278)
 Battle of Algeciras (1278) 
 Siege of Algeciras (1309)
 Siege of Algeciras (1342-1344)
 Siege of Algeciras (1369)
 Battle of Algeciras (1801) or the Algeciras Campaign
 First Battle of Algeciras
 Second Battle of Algeciras